The 13th World Sports Acrobatics Championships were held in Riesa, Germany, in 1996.

Men's Tumbling

Overall

Straight

Twisting

Men's Group

Overall

Balance

Tempo

Men's Pair

Overall

Balance

Tempo

Mixed Pair

Overall

Balance

Tempo

Women's Group

Overall

Balance

Tempo

Women's Pair

Overall

Balance

Tempo

Women's Tumbling

Overall

Straight

Twisting

References

Acrobatic Gymnastics Championships
Acrobatic Gymnastics World Championships
International gymnastics competitions hosted by Germany
1996 in German sport